Thoma of Villarvattom was a "king" (landlord) of Villarvattom, a vassal fiefdom of the Kingdom of Cochin ruled by the heirs of Villarvattom dynasty, an aristocratic Syrian Christian family of Udayamperoor.

The origin of this royal family is traced to the 9th century. Christianity spread in the kingdom of Villarvattom (Udayamperoor) under the saintly Chaldean bishop Mar Sapor who occupied the Episcopal seat of Quilon. According to tradition, Mar Sapor succeeded in converting the Villarvattom dynasty. Thus originated the Christian royal family of Malabar known as Villarvattom.

In 1439, Pope Eugene IV sent an apostolic letter through his legates to Thomas, the Villarvattom king in the following manner, "To our dearest son in Jesus the great king Thomas of India happiness and apostolic benediction. We have been often told that you and your subjects are true and faithful Christians”. Udayamperoor (known as Diamper in Portuguese), the capital of this kingdom, was the venue of the famous Synod of Diamper of 1599 CE. It was held in the All Saints Church in Diamper. The venue was apparently chosen on account of the place having been the capital of a Syrian Christian principality.

According to accounts, this Christian dynasty lasted till about the close of the 15th century. The last ruler of the line Jacob Swaroopam died without a male heir. His surviving daughter was married by a prince of the Cochin royal family who was converted to Christianity. So the territories of the Villarvattom came to be absorbed in the Kingdom of Cochin. Consequently, it was considered that the rulers of Cochin had a special responsibility for looking after the welfare of the Saint Thomas Christians of Malabar Coast. The Malabar Syrian Christians however preserved the royal emblems of the Villarvattom and presented this to Vasco da Gama, when he arrived in Cochin. This was done to show their homage to the Christian King of Portugal. His place of royalty were handed over to the succeeding descendants-Varghese family. The Tomb of Villarvattom Thoma Raja can be found in the Udayamperoor church.

In popular culture
The tale of Villarvattom dynasty is mentioned in the Malayalam novel Manja Veyil Maranangal (Yellow Lights of Death) by Benyamin.

See also 
 Pakalomattam family

References 

History of Ernakulam district
Saint Thomas Christians
People of the Kingdom of Cochin